Acacia orbifolia is a shrub belonging to the genus Acacia and the subgenus Phyllodineae that is endemic to western Australia.

Description
It often has a dense domed habit and has white waxy hairy branchlets. It blooms from July to September and produces white-cream-yellow flowers. The seed pods that form after flowering have constrictions between the seeds and are raised over them.

Distribution
It is native to an area in the Mid West and Wheatbelt regions of Western Australia where it is found on undulating plains, low hills and lateritic rises growing in gravelly clay, loam or sandy soils. The shrub has a scattered distribution from as far north as Northampton with the bulk of the population being found between Watheroo extending south to around Muntadgin mostly as a part of open Eucalyptus woodland communities.

See also
List of Acacia species

References

orbifolia
Acacias of Western Australia
Plants described in 1928
Taxa named by Joseph Maiden
Taxa named by William Blakely